The hospitality industry in the United Kingdom is largely represented by the country's hotels, pubs, restaurants and leisure companies, and produces around 4% of UK GDP.

Output
There are over 207,000 eating venues in England, and around 25% of these are fast-food outlets.

According to the British Beer and Pub Association, around 8.5 billion pints of beer were sold, with 7.4 billion 175ml glasses of wine, and 1.2 billion pints of cider in the UK in 2018. Beer has 54 pence of duty per pint. There are around 2530 breweries in the UK.

In a September 2015 report for the British Hospitality Association (BHA), the UK industry paid around £41bn in tax; around half of this is VAT. The tax paid in 2014 was around £7bn higher than that paid in 2010. Overseas visitor spending in the UK (not including international students) is reckoned to be around £22bn.

The UK tourist industry is the 8th largest tourism destination in the world. VisitBritain is responsible for tourists to the UK. In 2014 there were around 30m overseas visitors to the UK.

It is not one of the larger industries, by GDP, in the UK.

Closures
922 restaurants closed in 2019, and 1188 closed in 2018.

Training
The former Hotel and Catering Industry Training Board was formed 7 November 1966 and became the Hospitality Training Foundation, which ultimately became People 1st on 19 May 2004; it is the industry's sector skills council. In 2002 around eighty National Training Organisations (NTOs) became around twenty SSCs. The Council for Hospitality Management Education conversely has an international outlook.

The National Skills Academy for Food & Drink (NSAFD) is at York. The Institute of Hospitality was known as HCIMA - Hotel and Catering International Management Association, which became the IoH in April 2007. The Hotel and Catering Institute was founded in 1949; the professional body merged with the Institutional Management Association in 1971. Hotel, Restaurant & Catering (HRC) is a main national event.

Victor Ceserani MBE pioneered catering education in the UK, when he was head of catering at Ealing College, now part of University of West London; this had been Acton Hotel and Catering School until 1957 and trained many airline catering staff; he wrote The Theory of Catering and Practical Cookery, with Ronald Kinton and David Foskett (academic).

Colleges
Leicester College claim to be the East Midlands leading training school for catering and food manufacturing.  Kendal College also claims to train top chefs, and also Bournemouth and Poole College.

Universities
The University of Strathclyde had the Scottish Hotel School in the late 1960s. Strathclyde and the University of Surrey were the first two universities in UK to have hotel and catering management courses, both at the same time.

Hotels

The Royal National Hotel in Bloomsbury is the fourth-largest hotel in Europe, and the largest hotel in the UK, with around 1,600 rooms; there are three other hotels in London with over 1,000 rooms, with another being the Park Plaza Westminster Bridge.

The 39-storey Novotel London Canary Wharf (40 Marsh Wall) is the tallest purpose-built hotel in the UK, at 419 feet; it is the tallest Novotel hotel (owned by Accor); it opened in April 2017; it has beehives on the 39th floor, which produce fresh honey for guests; Novotel has thirty three hotels in the UK.

Companies
The Stonegate Pub Company (based close to the M1 in Luton) is the largest pub group in the UK, after it bought Ei Group in March 2020 for £3 billion.

Before it sold Costa Coffee in January 2019, Whitbread, in Houghton Regis in Bedfordshire, was the UK's largest hotel and restaurant group, owning Premier Inn, Brewers Fayre and Beefeater.

Premier Inn was developed and expanded in the 2000s largely during the leadership of Alan C. Parker, the chief executive of Whitbread.

Compass Group, in Chertsey in Surrey, is the largest contract foodservice company in the world. Sodexo UK employs around 43,000 people, and Compass Group UK has 45,000.

Workforce
In 2015 the UK hospitality industry employed around 2.9m people – around 9% of the UK workforce. By employment, it is the UK's fourth-largest industry. The most jobs in the industry are found in London (around 500,000) and South East England (around 400,000); 18% of workers in the UK industry are in London. There are around 1.5m restaurant workers, and around 0.5m work in hotels.

The Food Safety Act 1990 introduced the training that staff have to follow.

Contingent of EU employees
Around 25% of the hospitality workforce comes from the EU, making up around 25% of chefs and around 75% of waiting staff.

In 2019, 1 in 50 applicants to Pret a Manger was British.

See also
 List of hotels in the United Kingdom
 List of pubs in the United Kingdom
 List of restaurants in Scotland
 List of restaurants in Wales

References